is a Japanese professional footballer who plays as a forward for Belgian Pro League club Sint-Truiden, on loan from  Spanish club Deportivo Alavés.

Career

FC Tokyo
Taichi Hara joined J1 League club FC Tokyo in 2017.

Istra 1961
Hara signed with Croatian club NK Istra 1961 on 7 February 2021. Hara appeared in that year's Croatian Cup final, scoring twice as Istra lost 3–6 to Dinamo Zagreb.

Alavés
In July 2021 Hara moved to La Liga club Deportivo Alavés. On 23 August, however, he was loaned to Belgian side Sint-Truidense V.V. for one year.

On 23 January 2023, after spending the first half of the season with Alavés, Hara returned to STVV, also on loan.

Career statistics

Honours
FC Tokyo
J.League Cup: 2020

Individual
Croatian Cup Top goalscorer: 2020–21

References

External links

Profile at FC Tokyo

1999 births
Living people
People from Hino, Tokyo
Association football people from Tokyo Metropolis
Japanese footballers
Association football forwards
J1 League players
J3 League players
Segunda División players
FC Tokyo players
FC Tokyo U-23 players
NK Istra 1961 players
Deportivo Alavés players
Sint-Truidense V.V. players
Japanese expatriate footballers
Japanese expatriate sportspeople in Croatia
Expatriate footballers in Croatia
Japanese expatriate sportspeople in Spain
Expatriate footballers in Spain
Japanese expatriate sportspeople in Belgium
Expatriate footballers in Belgium
Japan under-20 international footballers